Harry Camp Lugg (9 May 1882 - November 1978) was Chief Commissioner for Native Affairs in Natal, South Africa.

Early life and family
Harry Camp Lugg was born on 9 May 1882.

Career
Lugg was Chief Commissioner for Native Affairs in Natal, South Africa.

Death and legacy
Lugg died in November 1978.

A selection of his papers is held in the Campbell Collections of the University of KwaZulu-Natal.

Selected publications
 Life Under a Zulu Shield
 Places of Interest in Natal and Zululand
 A Natal family looks back
 Historic Natal and Zululand, containing a series of short sketches of the historical spots
 Zulu FX20
 Zulu place names in Natal; a list of the more important mountains, rivers, estuaries and other places in Natal and Zululand with their Zulu names and meanings; also some personal names
 Agricultural ceremonies in Natal and Zululand

References

External links 
https://www.dnw.co.uk/auction-archive/lot-archive/lot.php?department=Medals&lot_id=112508

1882 births
1978 deaths
South African civil servants
South African non-fiction writers
Translators from Zulu
20th-century non-fiction writers
20th-century translators